Ocean City High School was a public high school in Ocean City, Worcester County, Maryland, United States.

Overview
The building was constructed in 1915 to serve as a teaching school.  In 1917, the building was sold by the state of Maryland to Ocean City and it became the island's first school.  It served students from elementary school through high school.  The high school students attended classes on the second floor.

The school remained in operation for 38 years when it was closed.  High school students from Ocean City were bused to the mainland to attend school at the newly opened Stephen Decatur High School. It remained an elementary school for many years until the new elementary school was built in West Ocean City. The building then became  City Hall for Ocean City .

The building is located on Maryland 528 and Third Street, four blocks north of the end of U.S. 50.  There have since been several additions to the building to accommodate the growing needs of City Hall.

Sports
State Champions

 1955 - Boys' Cross Country 
 1952 - Boys' Basketball 
 1952 - Boys' Cross Country

State Finalist

 1951 - Boys' Basketball
 1948 - Boys' Basketball

References and notes

Further reading
 Images of America: Ocean City Volume 1, Nan DeVincent-Hayes, PhD and John E. Jacob, 1999, Arcadia Publishing www.arcadiapublishing.com.

See also
 For a list of current high schools in Maryland: List of high schools in Maryland
 Worcester County Public Schools

External links
Map of Former School from Google Maps

Educational institutions established in 1917
Defunct schools in Maryland
Schools in Worcester County, Maryland
Educational institutions disestablished in 1955
Ocean City, Maryland
1917 establishments in Maryland
1955 disestablishments in Maryland